Cardigan is a suburb on the north-western rural-urban fringe of Ballarat in Victoria, Australia.

Cardigan Post Office opened 1 January 1861 and was closed on 30 June 1975.

References

Suburbs of Ballarat